Tal y Fan is an outlying peak of the Carneddau mountains in northern Wales. It is one of the four Marilyns that make up the Carneddau, the others being Carnedd Llywelyn, Pen Llithrig y Wrach and Creigiau Gleision.

It is the most northerly 2000 ft summit in Wales.

On 6 May 2013 BBC News reported that a precise GPS measurement of Tal y Fan's height had been verified by the Ordnance Survey as 609.98 metres or 2,001 feet, confirming its status as a mountain.
Bwlch y Ddeufaen separates Tal y Fan from the main Carneddau ridge, the closest summit on which is Carnedd y Ddelw. Pen y Castell is directly opposite to the south.

References

External links
 www.geograph.co.uk : photos of Tal y Fan and surrounding area
 A walk up Tal y Fan from Llanfairfechan

Mountains and hills of Snowdonia
Marilyns of Wales
Hewitts of Wales
Nuttalls
Mountains and hills of Conwy County Borough
Caerhun
Penmaenmawr